The 2017–18 Davidson Wildcats men's basketball team represented Davidson College during the 2017–18 NCAA Division I men's basketball season. The Wildcats were led by 29th-year head coach Bob McKillop and played their home games at the John M. Belk Arena in Davidson, North Carolina as fourth-year members of the Atlantic 10 Conference. They finished the season 21–12, 13–5 in the A-10 to finish in third place. In the A-10 tournament they defeated Saint Louis, St. Bonaventure, and Rhode Island to be A-10 Tournament champions. They received the A-10's automatic bid to the NCAA tournament where they lost in the first round to Kentucky.

Previous season
The Wildcats finished the 2016–17 season 17–15, 8–10 in A-10 play to finish in ninth place. In the A-10 tournament, they defeated La Salle and Dayton to advance to the tournament semifinals where they lost to Rhode Island.

Offseason

Departures

2017 recruiting class

Source

Preseason 
In a poll of the league's head coaches and select media members at the conference's media day, the Wildcats were picked to finish in sixth place in the A-10. Senior forward Peyton Aldridge was named to the conference's preseason first team.

Roster

Schedule and results

|-
!colspan=9 style=| Exhibition

|-
!colspan=9 style=| Non-conference regular season

|-
!colspan=9 style=| A-10 regular season

|-
!colspan=9 style=| A-10 tournament

|-
!colspan=9 style=| NCAA tournament

|-

References

Davidson Wildcats men's basketball seasons
Davidson
2017 in sports in North Carolina
2018 in sports in North Carolina
Davidson